Heytesbury is a village, civil parish and former hundred in Wiltshire, England.

Heytesbury may also refer to:

Relating to the Wiltshire place 
 Heytesbury (UK Parliament constituency), abolished 1832
 Baron Heytesbury, peerage of the United Kingdom

Other uses 
 Heytesbury Pty. Ltd., Australian company
 Heytesbury Street, Dublin, Ireland
 County of Heytesbury, Victoria, Australia
 Shire of Heytesbury, former local government area, Victoria, Australia
 Heytesbury Settlement Scheme, Victoria, Australia
 William of Heytesbury (c. 1313 – 1372/1373), English philosopher and logician
  Baron Hungerford of Heytesbury (1503 – 1540)